Magnus Haven is an alternative rock and pop band from Manila, Philippines. The band also described their music as a fusion of various musical genres with varying styles from one song to another.

The band is composed of Rajih Mendoza (lead vocals and rhythm guitar), David Galang (vocals and keyboards), Louise Vaflor (lead guitar and backing vocals), Rey Maestro (bass guitar and backing vocals), and Sean Espejo (drums and percussion).

The band is known for their hit song Imahe which is written by bassist Rey Maestro released in 2018.

History
According to the band members, the name Magnus Haven literally translates to "the greatest sanctuary".

The band originally started as an acoustic trio composed of childhood friends Louise Vaflor and Rey Maestro, together with Sean Espejo. Later on, they decided to forge a full-fledged band and held auditions for additional members wherein Rajih Mendoza and David Galang were then selected. The members were aged 18 to 23 when they started the band.

Personnel
Rajih Mendoza - lead vocals, rhythm guitar 
David Galang - vocals, keyboards, keytar 
Louise Vaflor - lead guitar, backing vocals
Rey Maestro - bass guitar, backing vocals
Sean Espejo - drums, percussion

Influences
The band cites South Border, IV of Spades, The Beatles, John Mayer, December Avenue, KZ Tandingan, Chris Brown, Kamikazee and Moira Dela Torre as major influences.

Discography

Notable singles
 Imahe
 Kapalmuks
 Panalangin
 Santuwaryo
 Multo
 Landas
 Noel
 Rosas
 Mapaglaro
 Oh, Jo
 Maria Clara

References

External links

Filipino rock music groups
Musical groups from Metro Manila
Musical groups established in 2017
2017 establishments in the Philippines